In enzymology, a phosphoglycerol geranylgeranyltransferase is an enzyme that catalyzes the chemical reaction

geranylgeranyl diphosphate + sn-glyceryl 1-phosphate  diphosphate + sn-3-O-(geranylgeranyl)glyceryl 1-phosphate

Thus, the two substrates of this enzyme are geranylgeranyl diphosphate and sn-glyceryl 1-phosphate, whereas its two products are diphosphate and sn-3-O-(geranylgeranyl)glyceryl 1-phosphate.

This enzyme belongs to the family of transferases, specifically those transferring aryl or alkyl groups other than methyl groups.  The systematic name of this enzyme class is geranylgeranyl diphosphate:sn-glyceryl phosphate geranylgeranyltransferase. Other names in common use include glycerol phosphate geranylgeranyltransferase, geranylgeranyl-transferase, and prenyltransferase.

References

 

EC 2.5.1
Enzymes of unknown structure